Mapleton is a borough in Huntingdon County, Pennsylvania, United States. The population was 441 at the 2010 census. It is located on the Juniata River, which is a tributary of the Susquehanna River.

History
Mapleton was founded when the Pennsylvania Railroad was extended to that point. The community was named for a grove of maple trees near the original town site.

The H.O. Andrews Feed Mill was listed on the National Register of Historic Places in 1990.

Geography
Mapleton is located in east-central Huntingdon County at  (40.392043, -77.940316), on the south bank of the Juniata River at the west entrance of that river's water gap through Jacks Mountain. Pennsylvania Route 655 passes through the center of the borough, leading south  to Saltillo and north  to U.S. Route 22. US 22 leads east  to Mount Union and northwest  to Huntingdon, the county seat.

Demographics

As of the census of 2000, there were 473 people, 191 households, and 135 families residing in the borough. The population density was 2,173.1 people per square mile (830.1/km²). There were 201 housing units at an average density of 923.5 per square mile (352.8/km²). The racial makeup of the borough was 97.67% White, 0.42% African American, 0.21% from other races, and 1.69% from two or more races. Hispanic or Latino of any race were 0.21% of the population.

There were 191 households, out of which 28.3% had children under the age of 18 living with them, 58.1% were married couples living together, 7.9% had a female householder with no husband present, and 28.8% were non-families. 22.0% of all households were made up of individuals, and 12.6% had someone living alone who was 65 years of age or older. The average household size was 2.48 and the average family size was 2.89.

In the borough the population was spread out, with 22.0% under the age of 18, 7.0% from 18 to 24, 28.1% from 25 to 44, 26.2% from 45 to 64, and 16.7% who were 65 years of age or older. The median age was 41 years. For every 100 females there were 88.4 males. For every 100 females age 18 and over, there were 92.2 males.

The median income for a household in the borough was $32,500, and the median income for a family was $38,125. Males had a median income of $35,556 versus $19,286 for females. The per capita income for the borough was $14,431. About 12.6% of families and 15.6% of the population were below the poverty line, including 17.9% of those under age 18 and 9.8% of those age 65 or over.

References

External links
 Mapleton, Pennsylvania (PA) Detailed Profile at City-Data.com

Populated places established in 1858
Boroughs in Huntingdon County, Pennsylvania
1858 establishments in Pennsylvania